Carex angustisquama is a tussock-forming species of perennial sedge in the family Cyperaceae. It is native to northern parts of Honshu in Japan.

The plant was first formally described by the botanist Adrien René Franchet in 1895 as a part of the work Bulletin de la Societe Philomatique de Paris.

See also
List of Carex species

References

angustisquama
Taxa named by Adrien René Franchet
Plants described in 1895
Flora of Japan